The Way We Get By is a 2009 documentary film directed by Aron Gaudet and produced by Gita Pullapilly, about a group of senior citizens in Bangor, Maine who greet U.S. troops at the Bangor International Airport. The Way We Get By had its world premiere at the 2009 South by Southwest Film Festival, winning the Special Jury Award for Best Documentary Feature. The film also won the Audience Award at the 2009 Full Frame Documentary Film Festival, the Standing Up Film Competition at the Cleveland International Film Festival, and the Best Documentary at the Atlanta, Little Rock, Naples, Phoenix, and Newport International Film Festivals. The film received a 2010 Cinema Eye nomination for Debut Feature Film.

In May 2009, the film had its Maine premiere, one of the largest movie premieres in the state of Maine. Maine National Guard members lined outside the Collins Center for the Arts on the University of Maine campus and greeted the subjects of the film and other greeters as they entered the auditorium. The Governor of Maine presented Gaudet with a special award recognizing the film.

The Way We Get By aired on the critically acclaimed PBS series, POV in November 2009 and August 3, 2010. The film has since been re-aired as part of the America ReFramed series on World channel, another network airing primarily public television programming.

International Film Circuit released The Way We Get By in over 60 cities across the United States and Films Transit handled the international distribution.

In October 2009, The Way We Get By had a special screening on Capitol Hill. Jill Biden, Second Lady of the United States, introduced the film and the entire Maine congressional delegation was present and honored the film. The next day, the film screened at Walter Reed Army Medical Center. During this trip, Gaudet, Pullapilly, and the three subjects of the film, received a special invitation to meet with Vice President Joseph Biden at the White House.

AARP named The Way We Get By Best Documentary of 2009 in their ninth annual Movies For Grownups Awards. During the acceptance speech, Gaudet called Morgan Freeman up to the stage for a picture with his mother, Joan Gaudet, one of the stars in the film, making for one of the most memorable highlights of the evening.

Gaudet and Pullapilly starting dating when they began making The Way We Get By, their first feature-length film. In October 2009, Real Weddings Maine provided them with a high-end free wedding to celebrate all they had done to capture the heart of Maine. Over 60 vendors in the state provided their products and services. The wedding took place at the Retreat at French's Point. Their wedding was highlighted in the New York Times Vows Section as well as other popular national wedding magazines and blogs.

Notes

External links 
 
 

2009 films
American documentary films
Films set in Maine
American independent films
2009 documentary films
2009 directorial debut films
2009 independent films
2000s English-language films
2000s American films